In Christianity, heaven is traditionally the location of the throne of God and the angels of God, and in most forms of Christianity it is the abode of the righteous dead in the afterlife. In some Christian denominations it is understood as a temporary stage before the resurrection of the dead and the saints' return to the New Earth.

In the Book of Acts, the resurrected Jesus ascends to heaven where, as the Nicene Creed states, he now sits at the right hand of God and will return to earth in the Second Coming. According to Catholic, Eastern Orthodox, and Oriental Orthodox teaching, Mary, mother of Jesus, is said to have been assumed into heaven without the corruption of her earthly body; she is venerated as Queen of Heaven.

In the Christian Bible, concepts about Christian eschatology, the future "kingdom of heaven", and the resurrection of the dead are found, particularly in the book of Revelation and in 1 Corinthians 15.

Early Christianity

The 1st-century early Jewish-Christians, from whom Christianity developed as a Gentile religion, believed that the kingdom of God was coming to earth within their own lifetimes, and looked forward to a divine future on earth. The earliest Christian writings on the topic are those by Paul, such as 1 Thessalonians 4–5, in which the dead are described as having fallen asleep. Paul says that the second coming will arrive without warning, like a "thief in the night," and that the sleeping faithful will be raised first, and then the living. Similarly, the earliest of the Apostolic Fathers, Pope Clement I, does not mention entry into heaven after death but instead expresses belief in the resurrection of the dead after a period of "slumber" at the Second Coming.

In the 2nd century AD, Irenaeus (a Greek bishop) quoted presbyters as saying that not all who are saved would merit an abode in heaven itself: "[T]hose who are deemed worthy of an abode in heaven shall go there, others shall enjoy the delights of paradise, and others shall possess the splendour of the city; for everywhere the Saviour shall be seen according as they who see Him shall be worthy."

According to Bart Ehrman, when the Kingdom of God did not arrive, Christian beliefs gradually changed into the expectation of an immediate reward in heaven after death, rather than to a future divine kingdom on earth, despite the churches' continuing to use the major creeds' statements of belief in a coming resurrection day and world to come.

Orthodox Christianity

Eastern Orthodox cosmology

Eastern Orthodox cosmology perceives heaven as having different levels, the lowest of which is paradise. At the time of creation, paradise touched the earth at the Garden of Eden. After the Fall of man, paradise was separated from the earth, and mankind was forbidden entry, lest he partake of the Tree of life and live eternally in a state of sinfulness. Upon the Crucifixion of Jesus, the Eastern Orthodox believe Jesus opened the door to paradise to mankind again, and the penitent thief was the first to enter.

Various saints have had visions of heaven. The Orthodox concept of life in heaven is described in one of the prayers for the dead: "…a place of light, a place of green pasture, a place of repose, from whence all sickness, sorrow and sighing are fled away".

However, in the Eastern Orthodox and Oriental Orthodox, it is only God who has the final say on who enters heaven. In the Eastern Orthodox Church, heaven is part and parcel of deification (theosis), the eternal sharing of the divine qualities through communion with the Triune God (reunion of Father and Son through love).

Roman Catholicism

The Catholic Church teaches that "heaven is the ultimate end and fulfillment of the deepest human longings, the state of supreme, definitive happiness". In heaven one experiences the beatific vision. The church holds that,
The Catechism of the Catholic Church indicates several images of heaven found in the Bible:

Those Christians who die still imperfectly purified must, according to Catholic teaching, pass through a state of purification known as purgatory before entering heaven.

Catholic authors have speculated about the nature of the "secondary joy of heaven", that is Church teaching reflected in the Councils of Florence and of Trent. For God "will repay according to each one's deeds" (Romans 2:6 ): ... "the one who sows sparingly will also reap sparingly, and the one who sows bountifully will also reap bountifully" (2 Corinthians 9:6 ). Jesuit poet Gerard Manley Hopkins describes this joy as reflecting Christ to one another, each in our own personal way and to the extent that we have grown more Christlike in this life, for as Hopkins writes, "Christ plays in ten thousand places, lovely in limbs, and lovely in eyes not his, to the Father through the features of men's faces." God means to share even this divine joy with us, the joy of rejoicing in making others happy.

Protestant Christianity

Some denominations teach that one enters heaven at the moment of death, while others teach that this occurs at a later time (the Last Judgment). Some Christians maintain that entry into Heaven awaits such time as "When the form of this world has passed away."

Two related, and often blended, concepts of heaven in Christianity are better described as the "resurrection of the body" as contrasted with "the immortality of the soul". In the first, the soul does not enter heaven until the Last Judgment or the "end of time" when it (along with the body) is resurrected and judged. In the second concept, the soul goes to a heaven on another plane immediately after death. These two concepts are generally combined in the doctrine of the double judgment where the soul is judged once at death and goes to a temporary heaven, while awaiting a second and final judgment at the end of the world.

Some teach that death itself is not a natural part of life, but was allowed to happen after Adam and Eve disobeyed God so that mankind would not live forever in a state of sin and thus a state of separation from God.

Methodist
Methodism teaches that heaven is a state where the faithful will spend eternal bliss with God:

Seventh-day Adventist

The Seventh-day Adventist understanding of heaven is:
 That heaven is a place where God resides. Described in Revelation 11:12 "they went to Heaven, wrapped in a cloud.." 
 That God sent his son, Jesus Christ to earth to live as a human being (Matthew 2:10 birth of Jesus) who "perfectly exemplified the righteousness and love of God shown by His miracles He manifested God's power and was attested as God's promised Messiah. He suffered and died voluntarily on the cross for our sins and in our place, was raised from the dead, and ascended to minister in the heavenly sanctuary in our behalf."
 That Christ promises to return as saviour at which time he will resurrect the righteous dead and gather them along with the righteous living to heaven. The unrighteous will die at Christ's second coming.
 That after Christ's second coming there will exist a period of time known as the Millennium during which Christ and his righteous saints will reign and the unrighteous will be judged.  At the close of the Millennium, Christ and his angels return to earth to resurrect the dead that remain, to issue the judgments and to forever rid the universe of sin and sinners.
 "On the new earth, in which righteousness dwells, God will provide an eternal home for the redeemed and a perfect environment for everlasting life, love, joy, and learning in His presence. For here God Himself will dwell with His people, and suffering and death will have passed away. The great controversy will be ended, and sin will be no more. All things, animate and inanimate, will declare that God is love; and He shall reign forever." It is at this point that heaven is established on the new earth.

Jehovah's Witnesses
Jehovah's Witnesses believe that heaven is the dwelling place of Jehovah and his spirit creatures. They believe that only 144,000 chosen faithful followers ("The Anointed") will be resurrected to heaven to rule with Christ over the majority of mankind who will live on Earth.

Latter Day Saint movement

The view of heaven according to the Latter Day Saint movement is based on section 76 of the Doctrine and Covenants as well as 1 Corinthians 15 in the King James Version of the Bible. The afterlife is divided first into two levels until the Last Judgment; afterwards it is divided into four levels, the upper three of which are referred to as "degrees of glory" that, for illustrative purposes, are compared to the brightness of heavenly bodies: the sun, moon, and stars.

Before the Last Judgment, spirits separated from their bodies at death go either to paradise or to spirit prison dependent on if they had been baptised and confirmed by the laying on of hands. Paradise is a place of rest while its inhabitants continue learning in preparation for the Last Judgment. Spirit prison is a place of learning for the wicked and unrepentant and those who were not baptised; however, missionary efforts done by spirits from paradise enable those in spirit prison to repent, accept the gospel and the atonement and receive baptism through the practice of baptism for the dead.

After the resurrection and Last Judgment, people are sent to one of four levels:
 The celestial kingdom is the highest level, with its power and glory comparable to the sun. Here, faithful and valiant disciples of Christ who accepted the fullness of his gospel and kept their covenants with Him through following the prophets of their dispensation are reunited with their families and with God the Father, Jesus Christ, and the Holy Spirit for all eternity. Those who would have accepted the gospel with all their hearts had they been given the opportunity in life (as judged by Christ and God the Father) are also saved in the celestial kingdom. Latter-Day Saint movements do not espouse the concept of original sin, but believe children to be innocent through the atonement. Therefore, all children who die before the age of accountability inherit this glory. Men and women who have entered into celestial marriage are eligible, under the tutelage of God the Father, to eventually become gods and goddesses as joint-heirs with Jesus Christ.
 The terrestrial kingdom's power and glory is comparable to that of the moon, and is reserved for those who understood and rejected the full gospel in life but lived good lives; those who did accept the gospel but failed to keep their covenants through continuing the process of faith, repentance, and service to others; those who "died without law" (D & C 76:72) but accepted the full gospel and repented after death due to the missionary efforts undertaken in spirit prison. God the Father does not come into the terrestrial kingdom, but Jesus Christ visits them and the Holy Spirit is given to them.
 The telestial kingdom is comparable to the glory of the stars. Those placed in the telestial kingdom suffered the pains of Hell after death because they were liars, murderers, adulterers, whoremongers, etc. They are eventually rescued from Hell by being redeemed through the power of the atonement at the end of the Millennium. Despite its far lesser condition in eternity, the telestial kingdom is described as being more comfortable than Earth in its current state. Suffering is a result of a full knowledge of the sins and choices which have permanently separated a person from the utter joy that comes from being in the presence of God and Jesus Christ, though they have the Holy Spirit to be with them.
 The Outer darkness is the lowest level and has no glory whatsoever. It is reserved for Satan, his angels, and those who have committed the unpardonable sin. This is the lowest state possible in the eternities, and one that very few people born in this world attain, since the unpardonable sin requires that a person know with a perfect knowledge that the gospel is true and then reject it and fight defiantly against God. The only known son of perdition is Cain, but it is generally acknowledged that there are probably more scattered through the ages.

References

Further reading
 Gary Scott Smith, Heaven in the American Imagination. New York: Oxford University Press, 2011.
 Colleen McDannell and Bernhard Lang, Heaven: A History. New Haven: Yale University Press, 1988; 2nd ed. 2001.
 Bernhard Lang, Meeting in Heaven: Modernising the Christian Afterlife, 1600-2000. Frankfurt: Peter Lang Publishing, 2011.

 Randy C. Alcorn, Heaven, Wheaton, Tyndale House, 2004.
 Jerry L. Walls, Heaven: The Logic of Eternal Joy, Oxford, Oxford University, 2002.

External links

 Christian's Heavenly Hope Article arguing against the Jehovah's Witnesses' doctrine of two classes of Christians after death

Christian terminology
Christianity
 
Christian cosmology